Kim Jung-hyun (born April 5, 1990) is a South Korean actor. He is best known for his lead roles in popular television series School 2017 (2017), Welcome to Waikiki (2018), and Time (2018). He gained international recognition by starring in the dramas Crash Landing on You (2019–20) and Mr. Queen (2020–21) which rank amongst the highest-rated Korean dramas in cable television history.

Early life
Kim was born in Busan in South Korea. He majored in acting at the Korea National University of Arts.

Career

2015: Beginnings
After having acted in several musical theatre plays, Kim made his silver screen debut in the film Overman, which premiered at the 2015 Busan International Film Festival. This earned him Best New Actor nominations at 25th Buil Film Awards and 22nd Chunsa Film Art Awards.

2016–2018: Rising popularity 

Kim made his small screen debut in 2016 and gained attention with his role as Gong Hyo-jin's younger brother in the romance comedy Don't Dare to Dream.

He then starred in historical drama The Rebel. The series was a critical and commercial success, and Kim won the Best New Actor award at the 2017 MBC Drama Awards.

The same year, he was cast in MBC's two-episode series, Binggoo, alongside Han Sun-hwa.

He also played the male lead in KBS2's teen drama School 2017 alongside Gugudan'''s Kim Se-jeong. The series was very popular among the youth leading to his increased popularity. Kim's portrayal of a troubled and rebellious student was praised by critics and audiences. The series earned him Best New Actor nominations at the 54th Baeksang Arts Awards, the 2017 KBS Drama Awards and the 1st The Seoul Awards.

Kim then featured in 4Men's Music Video Break Up In The Morning.

Later in the year Kim was cast in a lead role in KBS2 drama special Buzzcut Love.

In 2018, Kim starred in JTBC's youth series titled Welcome to Waikiki playing a cynical but kind-hearted movie director. The series was popular across Asia and solidified Kim's status as a versatile actor.

He then starred in the 4DX VR movie Stay With Me alongside Seo Yea-ji playing the role of an aspiring musician with stage fright. Kim lent his vocals to the OST of the movie titled Moonlight.

Later he starred in MBC melodrama Time alongside Girls' Generation's Seohyun, playing a chaebol whose time is running out due to his failing health. Kim's received critical praise for playing the drama's principal character, a terminal patient with few months to live. He withdrew halfway through the series due to an "eating disorder and sleep disorder". 

2019–present: Comeback and international fame
Kim returned to television in December 2019 when he joined the tvN romance drama Crash Landing on You alongside Hyun Bin, Son Ye-jin and Seo Ji-hye. It became the highest-rated tvN drama and the third-highest-rated Korean drama in cable television history. Kim's portrayal of Goo Seung-joon, former fiancé of Yoon Se-ri (Son Ye-jin) and eventual love interest to Seo Dan (Seo Ji-hye), received positive reviews from audiences. His character's name “Goo Seung-joon” went on to trend at No. 1 in Korea's realtime search rankings, which he later described in an interview as incredibly rewarding.

In May 2020, Kim made a cameo appearance in his Crash Landing on You co-star Seo Ji-hye's drama Dinner Mate playing the role of her long-term boyfriend.

On June 5, 2020, it was confirmed that Kim would lead tvN's fusion sageuk drama, Mr. Queen alongside Shin Hye-sun playing the role of King Cheoljong. The drama aired from December 2020 to February 2021. On February 15, 2021, Mr. Queen became the seventh-highest-rated Korean drama in cable television history and the fifth highest rated tvN drama on record. The Korea Times article praised Kim's complex portrayal of the two-faced King and noted that he "left a deep impression on viewers with a heavy presence that took the center of the play." Kim contributed his vocals to the soundtrack with the song Like the First Snow for which he also wrote the lyrics.

In September 2021, Kim signed with Story J Company followed by movie and drama casting news in 2022. In January 2022, his agency confirmed that he will appear as a Detective in an indie film called Se2cretIn 2023, Kim returned to television with MBC’s Kokdu: Season of Deity opposite actress Im Soo-hyang playing dual role of a Grim reaper and doctor.  Kim received praise for ‘Perfectly portraying two conflicting characters’ through a variety of charms.  He also lent his vocals to the opening theme song of the drama titled I am. 

Personal life
Military enlistment
Kim completed his mandatory military service as an assistant in Kangwon-do's 3rd division when he was 21 years old.

Controversy
In July 2018, during the press conference for his drama The Time, he was criticised for "answering questions unenthusiastically" and for refusing to link arms with his co-star Seohyun. He explained that it was because he was trying to stay in his character from the drama. He withdrew from the series halfway through its run, officially citing health reasons.

In April 2021, South Korean local tabloid Dispatch revealed alleged text messages between Kim Jung-hyun and actress Seo Yea-ji and pointed out requests from Seo as the reason behind Kim's behaviour at the press conference." In response, Seo's agency, Gold Medalist, denied the claim that she was the reason behind Kim's behaviour and abrupt exit from the series.

On April 14, he posted a personal handwritten apology, which read:

On May 12, Kim's representative released a statement to announce the expiration of his contract with O& Entertainment and to address the actor's health condition while filming The Time in 2018. Kim claimed that his agency had failed to fulfill their duty, and that he would take legal action against them for defamation and spreading false information. The same day, YTN revealed that they had obtained Kim's hospital records which showed that he was diagnosed with anxiety disorder, panic disorder, sleep disorder, and having depressive episodes. After the handwritten apology, he met The Time'' director, Jang Jun-ho, who expressed his willingness to work with him again.

Filmography

Film

Television series

Music video

Discography

Singles

Theatre

Awards and nominations

References

External links
 at STORY J COMPANY

1990 births
21st-century South Korean male actors
Living people
Male actors from Busan
South Korean male film actors
South Korean male television actors
Korea National University of Arts alumni